Jugoslavijo, more commonly known by its first verse Od Vardara pa do Triglava (From the Vardar to Triglav) is a 1974 Yugoslav folk song written by a Belgrade lawyer and compositor Milutin Popović Zahar and composed and sung by Danilo Živković. The song celebrates the homeland of Yugoslavia, proudly referring to its greatest extents, its rivers, mountains, forests, polja and the sea, its proud people, as well as the fight, blood and workforce that created it.

Background 
It was conceived by Popović for a competition led by the NIN magazine in the early 1970s in a search for a new song that would replace "Hey, Slavs" as the national anthem of the country. Popović was soon after approached by Živković with a request to write lyrics for a song tentatively named "Makedonijo" set in the traditional Macedonian  rhythm, initially intended for Aleksandar Sarievski. Popović and Živković would soon realize Popović's verses fit the metric time of Živković's composition, and the two agreed on merging them together.

Release
The song was offered to Jugoton, the largest Yugoslav record label, and recorded on a 7-inch vinyl single. The first reactions to the song were exceptionally negative; critics panned it as "kitsch" all over the press and the commission for culture of SR Croatia imposed sales taxes on the song for emphasizing obsolete elements of Yugoslav history, namely for observing farmers and shepherds and not industrial workers. With that, the song was put to shelves of the radio stations and mostly withdrawn from being broadcast, with one exception being on Radio Šabac. Živković, who sung the song, later acknowledged that Popović had not received official permission from the League of Communists of Yugoslavia to record a patriotic song and decided to sue Popović for jeopardizing his career, leading to their eventual friendship fall-out. According to Popović, the circumstances took an unexpected turn after a trumpet player from the Belgrade military orchestra who had previously played with the pair, uninformed about the public controversy, performed the song on board the ship Galeb in front of Josip Broz Tito. Tito endorsed the song and referred to it as "the true folk anthem", and the public campaigns against the song were immediately reversed.

In 1978 at the 11th World Festival of Youth and Students in Havana, Cuba, the Yugoslavian delegation was granted the honour of opening the ceremony. The Belgrade choir "Collegium Musicum" had chosen Jugoslavijo as the introductory song, which was received by the public with applause and calls for a reprise.

Popović and Živković were for a long time convinced that the song was of quality and confident in popularizing it, so in 1978 Živković went on recording a new version of the song with the Orchestra of Slavomir Kovandžić. Based on suggestions from military musicians, he wrote a melody resembling march rhythms performed in 1979 under the name "Domovino moja mila" (Homeland, my dear) by the Đerdan Ensemble. Although these versions were fairly popular, the song became a hit across the whole country and abroad after the 1980 arrangement by Zagreb-based ensemble  published by PGP-RTB. It soon became a part of many repertoires, choirs, ensembles and interpretators of folk music. Although it never fulfilled its original purpose of replacing the anthem, the song was among Yugoslavs, the compatriots and the diaspora received profoundly and considered an unofficial second anthem.

Legacy 
Since the breakup of Yugoslavia, like all songs celebrating the former country, Jugoslavijo is among controversial songs to be found played in public. By contrast, the song is well received by yugo-nostalgics and admirers of Yugoslavia in general and can be seen sung by folk choirs. The song has been featured in the 2016 Croatian film ZG80, which is set during the final years of tensions in the former Yugoslavia. It has also been used for the premiere tour for the 2006 comedy-drama Karaula (The Border Post). Song "Yugo" from the Slovenian pop rock group Rock Partyzani mixes a wide range of lyrics from the Yugoslav-era rock songs into one, which starts out with and includes the main verses from Jugoslavijo. The phrase '' itself nevertheless remains a common metonym in references to Yugoslavia and modern Yugosphere.

References 

1974 songs
Yugoslav patriotic songs